Tren Interurbano may refer to:

 Interurbano Line (Costa Rica)
 Toluca–Mexico City commuter rail